Burch may refer to:

People
Burch (surname)

Places
In the United States
Burch, Missouri
Burch, North Carolina
Burch, West Virginia

Elsewhere
Burch, Poland

See also
Burch v. Louisiana
Birch (disambiguation)